The D35 class are a class of diesel locomotives built by English Electric, Rocklea for Australian Iron & Steel's, Port Kembla steelworks between 1971 and 1975.

History
The D35 class were purchased to haul trains on Australian Iron & Steel's, Port Kembla network. They were used on coal trains from Kemira, Nebo and Wongawilli collieries as well as steel mill services. A downturn in the late 1970s saw six leased to the Public Transport Commission where as well as operating services in the Illawarra region, they operated as far as Bombo and Sydney.

All except previously scrapped D35 and D37 passed to Pacific National in August 2007 when BlueScope outsourced the operation of its rail network. D36, D38, D39 and D40-D45 were scrapped in 2018. D40 remains in service as a standby unit as of February 2021.

References

BHP Billiton diesel locomotives
Bo-Bo locomotives
English Electric locomotives
Diesel locomotives of New South Wales
Pacific National diesel locomotives
Railway locomotives introduced in 1971
Standard gauge locomotives of Australia
Diesel-electric locomotives of Australia